Yang Jin-mo is a South Korean film editor. He is best known internationally for his work on multiple Academy Award winner Parasite as editor, which earned him critical appraisal and recognition including an American Cinema Editors Award for Best Edited Feature Film – Dramatic at the American Cinema Editors Awards in 2020 and the 2019 Online Film Critics Society Award for Best Editing. This made Parasite the first non-English-language film to win the top prize at the American Cinema Editors' Eddie Awards. He was also nominated for the Academy Award for Best Editing for his work on Parasite.

Life and career 
Yang was educated in the United States; he attended Cherry Hill East High School in New Jersey and he graduated from Bard College in New York. His dream was to work for Disney. He started as an assistant editor on many productions, then proceeded to be the editor of several well-known Korean films, including Bong Joon-ho's Okja (2017), as well as films like The Tooth and the Nail (2017), the 2016 hit The Age of Shadows, the highly acclaimed 2016 zombie thriller Train to Busan, the 2016 action comedy Luck Key, and the 2015 romantic comedy The Beauty Inside. He then became the editor of Parasite (2019), which earned him critical appraisal and recognition including an American Cinema Editors Award for Best Edited Feature Film – Dramatic at the American Cinema Editors Awards in 2020. This made Parasite the first non-English-language film to win the top prize at the American Cinema Editors Awards. He was also nominated for the Academy Award for Best Editing for his work on the film.

Yang speaks fluent English.

References

External links 

Living people
South Korean film editors
Bard College alumni
Cherry Hill High School East alumni
Year of birth missing (living people)